Stawiec may refer to the following places in Poland:
Stawiec, Lower Silesian Voivodeship (south-west Poland)
Stawiec, Malbork County in Pomeranian Voivodeship (north Poland)
Stawiec, Nowy Dwór Gdański County in Pomeranian Voivodeship (north Poland)
Stawiec, Warmian-Masurian Voivodeship (north Poland)